Bellenden Road is a street in southeast London. The local area around it, situated between Peckham, Camberwell and East Dulwich, is known as Bellenden.

History
Bellenden is claimed by residents to be distinct from any of its surrounding neighbours for a number of reasons, although others argue that it is just part of Peckham, East Dulwich or Camberwell. Named after the 7th Lord Bellenden of Broughton, Bellenden Road was laid out along with neighbouring streets from the 1870s on what had formerly been largely fruit gardens serving the City of London.

French Influence
From its earliest days, Bellenden was populated disproportionately by French Huguenots, and still retains something of its French flavour, with various streets, pubs and businesses carrying French names such as the Montpelier Public House, Petit Chou cafe and Choumert Road attracting a significant French population to the area. For this reason Bellenden has for some years been known as 'the French Quarter'.

Art 
Artists such as Antony Gormley, Tom Phillips and John Latham have lived and worked on Bellenden Road and in the area. As part of Southwark Council's Bellenden Area Renewal programme Gormley designed bollards and street furniture for the area, Phillips designed lampposts and mosaics, several shop fronts were refitted and Latham installed a major artwork through the front of his house and studio which he named Flat Time House. Flat Time House is now a publicly accessible art and education space and houses the John Latham archive.

Bellenden has a growing spread of shops and cafes. The Bellenden Road Nature Garden is a nature reserve managed by London Wildlife Trust.

References 

Areas of London